Reno Rumble is the first season of Australian reality television series Reno Rumble, it aired on the Nine Network. Season one had former contestants from The Block on the Nine Network against former contestants from House Rules on the Seven Network. It was hosted by Scott Cam and judged by Darren Palmer and Romy Alwill. It premiered on May 5, 2015. The season was won by Ayden and Jess Hogan who received $100,000 with half to charity and a Mazda CX-5.

Format
Each week each individual team within The Redbacks (The Block) and The Bluetongues (House Rules) are allocated two rooms to deliver, first room is delivered within the first 48 hours, the highest scored individual team will receive immunity from elimination. The teams will then work on their second room the rest of the week, the team with the highest score are safe from elimination, the individual team with the lowest score in the losing team are eliminated.

Contestants 
Nine has announced the 8 teams from The Block & House Rules who will compete on Reno Rumble.

Elimination history

Weekly Results

 The team was on the losing team.
 The team was the winning team
 The team had immunity
 The team was eliminated.
 The team were eliminated as team captains
  Series winner 
  Series runner up

Results

Week 1
 Episodes 1 to 5
 Airdate — 5 to 11 May 2015
 Location — Mill Park
The week is split in two, The first 48 hours of renovation is to renovate their first room and the individual team with the highest score will receive immunity from elimination.

The rest of the week is to renovate the second room, the whole team (red or blue) with the highest score are the weeks winning team and avoid elimination, the lowest scoring individual team in the losing team will be eliminated.

 Colour key:
  – Immunity
  – Eliminated
  – Eliminated as Team Captains
  – Winning Team
  – Losing Team

Week 2
 Episodes 6 to 9
 Airdate — 12 to 17 May 2015
 Location — Northcote
The redbacks had to add a team space to be judged for first room to make up points due to the eliminated team.

Week 3
 Episodes 10 to 13
 Airdate — 18 to 24 May 2015
 Location — Hampton

Week 4
 Episodes 14 to 16
 Airdate — 25 to 31 May 2015
 Location — Yarraville
This week, a team member from each side were swapped. Ayden and Jess joined bluetongues and Ben and Jemma joined redbacks

Week 5 (Semi-Finals Week)
 Episodes 17 to 20
 Airdate — 1 to 7 June 2015
 Location — Kingsville
Due to Ben & Jemma's (Bluetongue) elimination, Carly and Leighton, the last bluetongue team, will have Ayden & Jess stay on as a Bluetongue team. There were no team captains as each couple on each team worked as one. This week has a double elimination & no immunity but an extra $10,000 for their reno. First rooms tied scores and both received $5,000 extra.

Week 6 (Grand Final Week)
 Episodes 21 to 27
 Airdate — 8 to 22 June 2015
 Location — Seddon

For the second rooms, each team got to receive a helping hand from an eliminated team, bluetongues chose Jemma and Ben and redbacks choose Kyal and Kara.

Ratings
 Colour key:
  – Highest rating during the series
  – Lowest rating during the series
  – An elimination was held in this episode
  – Finals week

Notes
Preliminary ratings – viewers and nightly position.
Includes Team Space points
Redback team were swapped to Bluetongues team
Bluetongue team were swapped to Redbacks team

References

2015 Australian television seasons